Yahoo Serious (born Greg Gomez Pead; 27 July 1953) is an Australian film actor, director, and score composer. His films include the comedy films Young Einstein (1988), Reckless Kelly (1993), and Mr. Accident (2000). Serious writes, directs, produces, stars in, and has composed the scores for his movies.

Early life
Pead was born on 27 July 1953 in Cardiff, City of Lake Macquarie in the Hunter Region, New South Wales. He attended Glendale East Public School and Cardiff High School, then worked as a tyre fitter to pay for his tuition at the National Art School in Sydney, but was expelled.

Career
After being expelled from art school, Serious co-wrote, co-produced, edited and directed at age 21 his first film, Coaltown, "with the assistance of the Australian Film Institute". Released in 1977, Coaltown explores the social and political history of coal mining.

In 1988, Serious co-wrote, produced, directed, and played the title role in Young Einstein as a young apple farmer in Tasmania who derives the formula E=mc² while trying to discover a means of creating beer bubbles, splitting the beer atom in the process. After leaving Tasmania for Sydney on the mainland to patent his discovery, he goes on to develop rock music and surfing, romances Marie Curie, and saves Paris from an atomic bomb. The film's popularity propelled Serious to stardom which saw him appear on the cover of TIME magazine and the Australian edition of Mad magazine, and even get his own primetime slot on MTV. The movie was a success in Australia but a critical and commercial flop upon receiving a wide release in the United States.

In 1993, Serious released his next film, Reckless Kelly, a satire about a modern descendant of the notorious Australian bank robber Ned Kelly who also becomes a movie star in Hollywood.  While Reckless Kelly was a hit in Australia, it failed outside of the country and ended Serious's bid for mainstream international popularity. In 2000, Serious released his third film, Mr. Accident, about the most accident-prone man in the world.  Like Reckless Kelly, the film was not a commercial success outside Australia.

Serious is a director of the Kokoda Track Foundation, a humanitarian organisation focused on Papua New Guinea.

In 2019 in a rare Q&A session at Sydney's Hayden Orpheum picture palace, Serious stated in response to a question about what he had been doing recently, “I have been writing and I hope to continue to make some more movies.”

Honours and awards

Serious received an honorary doctorate from the University of Newcastle in 1996.

Serious was a guest celebrity for the opening of the 2000 Sydney Olympics.

Personal life
Shortly after the production of Young Einstein,  Serious married Lulu Pinkus. Their relationship ended in 2007.

In July 2020, Serious was evicted from his Sydney rental property and ordered to pay $15,000 in rent arrears to the landlords. Serious stated that he was unable to pay due to the impacts of COVID-19, but was unable to substantiate this claim.

Lawsuit against Yahoo!
In August 2000, Yahoo Serious sued the search engine Yahoo! for trademark infringement. The case was thrown out because Serious could not prove that he sells products or services under the name "Yahoo" and therefore could not prove that he suffered harm or confusion due to the search engine.

Filmography
Young Einstein (1988) – Actor, director, writer and producer
Reckless Kelly (1993) – Actor, director, writer and producer
Mr. Accident (2000) – Actor, director, writer and producer

As himself
Cinema 3 – (1990) – TV series, 1 episode
Waltzing Matilda: The Song That Shaped a Nation (1995) – Documentary
In the Cannes (2007) – Short documentary film

Notes

References

External links
 
 

Australian male film actors
Australian film directors
Australian film producers
Australian screenwriters
Australian male comedians
1953 births
Living people
People from New South Wales
English-language film directors
Comedy film directors